2012 UEFA European Under-17 Football Championship (qualifying round) was the first round of qualifications for the Final Tournament of UEFA U-17 Championship 2012. Matches were played between September 21–November 2, 2011. All times are CET/CEST.

The 52 teams were divided into 13 groups of four teams, with each group being contested as a mini-tournament, hosted by one of the group's teams. After all matches have been played, the 13 group winners and 13 group runners-up advanced to the elite round. 

Alongside the 26 winner and runner-up teams, the two best third-placed teams also qualified. These were determined after considering only their results against their group's top two teams, and applying the following criteria in this order:
Higher number of points obtained in these matches;
Superior goal difference from these matches;
Higher number of goals scored in these matches;
Fair-play conduct of the teams in all group matches in the qualifying round;
Drawing of lots.

Draw
The draw took place at 30 November 2010 in Nyon.

The hosts of each of the mini-tournament is marked in italics.

Group 1

Group 2

Group 3

Group 4

Group 5

Group 6

Group 7

Group 8

Group 9

Group 10

Group 11

Group 12

Group 13

Ranking of 3rd placed teams
Counting results against group winners and runners-up. Top 2 will advance to the Elite Round.

References

External links
 UEFA website

Qualification
UEFA European Under-17 Championship qualification